Jøvik is a village in Tromsø Municipality in Troms og Finnmark county, Norway. The proposed Ullsfjord Bridge would cross the Ullsfjorden near Jøvik, reducing the travel time to central Tromsø by half. The village has road access via the Fv293 road to the village of Lakselvbukt to the south and further to the European route E8 highway. Before the road was built in the 1970s a ferry went from Jøvik to Breivikeidet.

Jøvik was one of the largest villages in the former municipality of Ullsfjord. Jøvik Chapel was built in 1920. The Jøvik Sildolje & Kraftforfabrik [Jøvik herring oil & concentrates factory] was based here, which in the 1970s was the country's second largest herring factory, but was closed in 1996. The subsequent decades have been characterised by a declining and ageing population.  In 2018, there were about 36 residents in Jøvik.

References

Villages in Troms
Tromsø